Nikolay Davydenko was the defending champion, but lost in the quarterfinals to Marat Safin.

Unseeded Igor Kunitsyn won in the final 7–6(8–6), 6–7(4–7), 6–3, against first-seeded Marat Safin.

Seeds

Draw

Finals

Top half

Bottom half

External links
Draw
Qualifying draw

Kremlin Cup
Kremlin Cup